Chicago common brick are brick that were made in the Chicago, IL area during the 20th century. They have a unique color range due to the raw materials and the way that they were manufactured. The clays used to make these brick are unusually high in carbonates such as limestone giving brick their lighter color. Many brick were fired in periodic kilns or scove kilns that helped create their large color range. The use of brick construction increased in Chicago after the Great Chicago fire of 1871. They are called common brick since they were used in multiwythe mass walls with many of the brick used on inner wythes while a facing brick was used for the outer wythe. Most of the brick manufacturers closed around the middle of the 20th century, and now Chicago Commons are highly desirable as a salvaged material.

References

Bricks
Building materials
Building materials companies of the United States